Yerevan Wine Days (3-5 June, 2022) (also called YereWineDays, abbr. YWD, Armenian: Երևանի Գինու Օրեր) is a street wine festival in Yerevan, Armenia. The festival has been held annually since 2017 and takes place on several central streets of Yerevan. Since 2021 the festival is held on the first week of June.

Purpose 
The main goal of the event is to promote wine tourism in Armenia and to ensure the recognition of the wine industry in the country. The event has positively influenced the Armenian wine industry and raised the awareness of wine tourism. Since the event's conception, the number of vineyards and wine production in Armenia have increased.

Process 
The event is free to attend, but to taste the presented wines, visitors need to buy special tasting packages. The packages include a lanyard case, a wine glass and a brochure with several coupons containing information about the winemakers. Armenian bands and DJs also perform at the event.

Participants 

The event involves a great number of Armenian and Artsakh winemakers, as well as restaurants and cafes featuring dishes and sweets specific to Armenian, Japanese, Mexican, Italian, French cuisines.

In three years (2017-2019) there have been 79 wine-presenting participants. The following museums were presented in Yerevan Wine Days 2019:

 Hovhannes Toumanian museum
 Ara Sargsyan and Hakob Kojoyan Museum
 Martiros Sarian House-Museum

The event also hosts Armenian musicians, small bands and artists to join the musical part which is a set of various performances on large and several small stages situated in different parts of the streets.

Visitors

Yerevan Wine Days had over 25,000 visitors in 2017, about 30,000 in 2018, and more than 30,000 in 2019. These numbers caught the attention of Forbes’ journalist Tom Mullen, who mentioned Yerevan Wine Days in his article "Yerevan City In Armenia Is A Jewel For Travel, Food And Wine":

"Yerevan Wine Days—a two-day, free festival focused on showcasing national food and some 200 Armenian wines. The event includes music and traditional dances."

The Chronology of the Event 

 2022 - June 3-5, Saryan, Moskovyan and Tumanyan streets, Yerevan
 2021 - June 4–5, Saryan, Moskovyan and Tumanyan streets, Yerevan
2020 - May 3, Online Yerevan Wine Days 2020
2019 - May 3–4, Saryan and Moskovyan streets, Yerevan In 2019 it was dedicated to 150th anniversary of the national poet of Armenia Hovhannes Tumanyan.
2018 - May 11–12, Saryan street, Yerevan In 2018 Yerevan Wine Days was dedicated to the 2800th anniversary of Erebuni-Yerevan
2017 - May 5–6, Saryan street, Yerevan
Because of the  COVID-19 pandemic Yerevan Wine Days 2020, which was to be held on May 1–2, has been postponed until 2021.

Symbols

The emblem of the Yerevan Wine Days event is a traditional Armenian wine jar (karas, Armenian: կարաս) that depicts a cuneiform inscription left by King Argishti I of Urartu. A cuneiform inscription is archaeological evidence which indicates that the Urartian military fortress of Erebuni (Էրեբունի) was founded in 782 BC by the orders of King Argishti I at the site of modern-day Yerevan.

References

Yerevan